The 1920 Ohio State Buckeyes football team represented Ohio State University in the 1920 college football season. They outscored opponents 150–20 in the regular season and beat Michigan, 14–7. The Buckeyes compiled a 7–1 record, including the 1921 Rose Bowl in Pasadena, California, where they lost 28–0 to California.

Schedule

Coaching staff
 John Wilce, head coach, eighth year

References

Ohio State
Ohio State Buckeyes football seasons
Big Ten Conference football champion seasons
Ohio State Buckeyes football